Tang Kushak or Tang-e Kushk may refer to:
 Tang-e Kushk, Kohgiluyeh